"You Can't Go Home Again" is the fifth episode of the first season of the reimagined Battlestar Galactica television series.

Plot

In the fleet
After ejecting from her Viper, Starbuck awakens on a moon with a poisonous atmosphere. While avoiding being dragged over a cliff by her tangled-up parachute, Starbuck hits her knee on a rock, seriously injuring it. Starbuck is left trapped on the moon's surface with around two days of air and her radio broken.

Boomer is able to rescue Hotdog from his disabled Viper, but finds no sign of Starbuck. In response, Apollo begins a search and rescue mission for Starbuck, ultimately focusing the majority of the search on the moon Starbuck crashed on. Due to the composition of the moon's atmosphere, the search consumes over 40% of Galactica's aviation fuel reserves and leaves over a dozen Vipers down for maintenance. Even when Starbuck's air supply runs out, Commander William Adama refuses to abandon the search, relieving Colonel Tigh of duty when he disagrees and redeploying the CAP to the search despite it leaving the fleet essentially defenseless.

In the early stages of the search, President Laura Roslin offers her help, lending the civilian ships to Galactica's search for Starbuck. Doctor Gaius Baltar is reminded by his internal Six that they have at most three days before the Cylons realize their patrol is missing and send more ships. Baltar warns Roslin who presses on, but grows increasingly alarmed by Adama and Apollo's tactics. After learning of their history with Starbuck from Colonel Tigh, Roslin is able to make the two men see sense and call off the search.

While the search goes on, Starbuck searches for higher ground in hopes of being found. In her search, Starbuck finds the Cylon Raider she shot down before crashing on the moon. Finding the Raider intact aside from a hole in the "head" where her shot hit, Starbuck decides to hijack the ship to return to Galactica. To Starbuck's surprise, she finds that the Raider is actually a living being instead of a mechanical ship and manages to repair the hole and figure out the Raider's controls.

As the fleet prepares to jump, they detect Starbuck's hijacked Raider on DRADIS. Unaware that the ship is under the control of Starbuck, Apollo is launched to intercept and destroy it. Starbuck is able to evade Apollo's attempts to destroy her and get over his ship, revealing her name written on the underside of the Raider's wings. Realizing that the Raider is under the control of Starbuck, the relieved Adama allows Apollo to escort it aboard Galactica. On board, Starbuck is taken to the infirmary where she reconciles with Adama about Zak's death.

On Caprica
Fifteen days after the fall of the Twelve Colonies, Helo and Sharon remain in the fallout shelter they discovered under a restaurant a few days before. While the two have come to enjoy the place as a home, Helo expresses a desire to continue searching for a way off of Caprica now that they have three months of anti-radiation medication and his leg wound has healed.

While making breakfast, Helo is discovered by a patrol of Cylon Centurions. Helo destroys one, but is knocked unconscious by falling debris in the gunfight. Upon regaining consciousness, Helo finds the remaining Centurion gone and no sign of Sharon.

References to original series
Starbucks escape in a captured Cylon fighter, and her celebratory 'wing waggle', is a reference to the original Battlestar Galactica (1978 TV series) episode "Hand of God", in which Starbuck and Apollo escape a Cylon Base Ship in a captured fighter and identify themselves by waggling their wings whilst approaching the Galactica.

External links
 "You Can't Go Home Again" at Syfy
 

2004 American television episodes
Battlestar Galactica (season 1) episodes

fr:Saison 1 de Battlestar Galactica#Crash sur la lune